NH 33 may refer to:
 National Highway 33 (India)
 New Hampshire Route 33 (U.S.)